Berezhyntsi is a village and village council (silska rada) in Khmelnytskyi Raion of Khmelnytskyi Oblast in western Ukraine. The village belongs to Teofipol settlement hromada, one of the hromadas of Ukraine. Its population was 537 as of the 2001 Ukrainian census.

History
Berezhyntsi was first founded in 1579. In 2000, the Berezhyntsi Village Council was created, which also contains the village of Ridka within its jurisdiction.

Until 18 July 2020, Berezhyntsi belonged to Teofipol Raion. The raion was abolished in July 2020 as part of the administrative reform of Ukraine, which reduced the number of raions of Khmelnytskyi Oblast to three. The area of Teofipol Raion was merged into Khmelnytskyi Raion.

References

Populated places established in 1579
Villages in Khmelnytskyi Raion